William Paul King is an American mechanical engineer, currently the Ralph A. Andersen Endowed Chair at the University of Illinois.

References

Year of birth missing (living people)
Living people
University of Illinois faculty
American mechanical engineers
Stanford University alumni
University of Dayton alumni
Engineers from Ohio